The North Dakota Department of Career and Technical Education is part of the government of the U.S. State of North Dakota. The department is a component of the state's education system that provides technical skills and knowledge for students to succeed in careers and cross-functional workplace skills such as teamwork, problem solving, and the ability to find and use information. The state's director is Wayde Sick.

Function
The department and its employees oversee all of the state's student organizations that focus on preparing students for the business world; FBLA, TSA, SkillsUSA, FCCLA, DECA, and FFA.

External links
North Dakota Department of Career and Technical Education website

State agencies of North Dakota